Angelos Pitzamanos (1467–1535)  was a Greek Renaissance painter.  The artists is sometimes referred to as Angelos Bitzamanos.  He was born in Crete and migrated to Otranto, Southern Italy where he did most of his work.  A contract between Andreas Pavias and Pitzamanos illustrates that Pitzamanos was his apprentice.  Angelos was a student of Andreas Pavias for five years (1482-1487).  It is evident that his work featured both the Greek style and Italian style of the time.  Pitzamanos later became a famous master.

History
Angelos was born on the island of Candia.  His father's name was Nicholas.  Both Angelos and his brother Donatos were active painters.  Angelos studied under Andreas Pavias for five years.  He traveled all over the Venitian Empire painting for various patrons.  Some of the works were signed by him and his brother.

Bizamanos painted a very famous triptych which was exhibited in Rome at the Accoramboni Palace.  The triptych was acquired by Henry Walters with the Massarenti collection in 1902.  The central panel features Christ and the Virgin.  The left-wing shows Saint Jerome in the desert and the right features John the Baptist.  The triptych was painted by Angelos Bitzamanos, an inscription on the inside left indicates Angelus/Bi/Zamanus/Pinxit.  Another form of his inscription was Angelus Bizamanus Grecus Cadiotus Pinxit in Otranto.  Some of these works are in the Walters Art Museum.

Angelos was active in Crete, Dalmatia, and Italy.  In 1518, he was commissioned to create an altarpiece for the Confraternity of the Holy Spirit in Komolac, Dalmatia, a colony of Venice.  His brother Donata Bizamanos joined him.  They painted together in Otranto and Barletta.  Some other pieces included the Predella of Komolac and Icon of Visitation by Angles.

Gallery

See also
Greek scholars in the Renaissance
Madonna of Constantinople

References

1467 births
1535 deaths
Cretan Renaissance painters
Greek Renaissance humanists
15th-century Byzantine people
16th-century Greek people
15th-century Greek painters
16th-century Greek painters
Artists from Crete